The W.W. Ashburn House, at 609 1st Avenue SW in Moultrie, Georgia, was built in 1900–1901. It was listed on the National Register of Historic Places in 1982.

It is a two-story late Victorian-style house with some Georgian Revival features. It was deemed notable for its architecture and for its association with W. W. Ashburn (1838-1906), bank president of the first bank in Moultrie.

As of 2017, the house was purchased by an unknown buyer and moved to a new location.

References

Houses on the National Register of Historic Places in Georgia (U.S. state)
Victorian architecture in Georgia (U.S. state)
Georgian Revival architecture in Georgia (U.S. state)
National Register of Historic Places in Colquitt County, Georgia
Houses completed in 1901